"It'll Be Me" is a song written by J.P. Pennington and Sonny LeMaire, and recorded by American country music group Exile.  It was released in July 1986 as the fourth single from the album Hang On to Your Heart.  The song was Exile's seventh number one country single in North America.  The single went to number one for one week and spent a total of fifteen weeks on the country chart.

Charts

References

1986 singles
Exile (American band) songs
Songs written by J.P. Pennington
Song recordings produced by Buddy Killen
Epic Records singles
1986 songs
Songs written by Sonny LeMaire